La Salle High School is the name of several educational institutions affiliated with the Institute of the Brothers of the Christian Schools, also known as the Lasallian Brothers, a Roman Catholic religious teaching order founded by French Priest Saint Jean-Baptiste de la Salle:

 Lasallian educational institutions

La Salle High School may also refer to the following educational institutions:

In Brazil:
 La Salle School (Curitiba, Paraná)

In Canada:
 LaSalle Community Comprehensive High School, in LaSalle, Quebec
 La Salle Secondary School, in Kingston, Ontario

In Japan:
 Hakodate La Salle High School
 La Salle High School (Kagoshima, Japan)

In Malaysia:
 La Salle School, Brickfields in Brickfields, Kuala Lumpur
 La Salle School, Klang, Selangor
 La Salle High School (Petaling Jaya), in Petaling Jaya, Selangor
 La Salle Secondary School, Kota Kinabalu, Sabah

In Pakistan:
 La Salle High School Faisalabad, in Faisalabad, Punjab, Pakistan
 La Salle High School Multan, in Multan, Punjab, Pakistan

In Peru:

 La Salle School (Lima)

In the Philippines:
 La Salle Green Hills High School, in Mandaluyong
 De La Salle-Santiago Zobel School, in Muntinlipa City

In the United States:
 La Salle School (Albany, New York), Albany, New York
 La Salle High School (Pasadena, California)
 La Salle High School (Cincinnati, Ohio)
 La Salle High School (Miami, Florida)
 La Salle High School (Milwaukie, Oregon)
 La Salle Academy, New York City, a private high school, also referred to as La Salle Academy High School
 La Salle High School (Niagara Falls, New York)
 La Salle High School (Louisiana), in Olla, Louisiana
 La Salle College High School, in Wyndmoor, Pennsylvania
 LaSalle-Peru High School, in LaSalle, Illinois
 La Salle High School (Union Gap, Washington)
 La Salle High School in Iowa, now Xavier High School (Cedar Rapids, Iowa), following a merger with Regis High School in 1998
 La Salle High School in Texas Cathedral High School (El Paso, Texas)